Humberto Giannini Íñiguez (25 February 1927 – 25 November 2014) was a Chilean philosopher of Italian descent.

Biography
The son of Osvaldo Giannini and Olga Íñiguez Maturana, Humberto Giannini was born in San Bernardo, and grew up in Valparaíso. He was the brother of deputy Osvaldo Giannini Iñíguez.

Giannini described his studies as "a life a bit uneven". He was thrown out of school because of discipline problems and was a sailor for two years. Then he resumed his studies at a night school and became "a great reader of philosophy." He enrolled at the University of Chile's  in 1953, where he would teach beginning in 1958, and where he would become, years later, professor emeritus and director of the UNESCO Chair of Philosophy based in Santiago.

He studied Hermeneutics and Philosophy of Religion at the Sapienza University of Rome, a two-year scholarship from the Italian government. His degree thesis was on the Metaphysics of Language. After the military coup of 11 September 1973, he got on "very badly...I received reprimands; they did not promote me for a long time and they suppressed the philosophy department of which I was director (at the Santiago North Headquarters of the University of Chile)."

In 1998 he was elected an active member of the Academia Chilena de la Lengua, where he occupied chair No. 12.

Regarding his work, it has been said:

Several essays have been dedicated to his work, some of which have been collected in Humberto Giannini: filósofo de lo cotidiano (LOM Ediciones/Academy of Christian Humanism University, Santiago, 2010). In El pensamiento filosófico latinoamericano, del Caribe y 'latino' (1300–2000), edited by Enrique Dussel, Eduardo Mendieta, and Carmen Bohórquez, a section is dedicated to his thinking (Siglo XXI Editores/Crefal, Mexico, 2009).

Death
On 25 November 2014, he fell into a coma and later died at Santiago's .

Awards and distinctions
 Santiago Municipal Literature Award (1982)
 Manuel Montt Award (1993)
 Doctor Honoris Causa from the University of Paris (1998)
 National Prize for Humanities and Social Sciences (1999)
 National Book and Reading Council Award (2008), Essay category, for La metafísica eres tú
 Altazor Award (2009), Essay category, for La metafísica eres tú
 Jorge Millas Award (2012)
 Municipality of Ñuñoa Illustrious Distinction (2011) for his invaluable contribution to the world of philosophy and the humanities
 Juvenal Hernández Jaque Medal (2013)

Selected works
 Reflexiones acerca de la convivencia humana (1965)
 El mito de la autenticidad (1968)
 Desde las palabras (1981)
 Breve Historia de la Filosofía (1985; numerous reprintings by Editorial Universitaria and Editorial Catalonia)
 La reflexión cotidiana: hacia una arqueología de la experiencia (1987; 6th edition in 2004), 338 pgs., 
 La experiencia moral (1992)
 Del bien que se espera y del bien que se debe (1997)
 El pasar del tiempo y su medida (2001), Editorial Universitaria, 
 La metafísica eres tú, Editorial Catalonia, 2007

References

External links
 Humberto Giannini (1927–2014) at the University of Chile
 Humberto Giannini (1927–2014) at Memoria Chilena

1927 births
2014 deaths
20th-century Chilean philosophers
21st-century philosophers
Chilean people of Italian descent
Chilean philosophers
People from Maipo Province
Sapienza University of Rome alumni
University of Chile alumni
Academic staff of the University of Chile